Litene Parish is situated in Gulbene Municipality, Latvia. It was an administrative unit of Gulbene District. The administrative center is Litene.

Territory - 127 km²

Population (01.01.2005) - 1,250.

Inhabited places - Atpūtas, Aurova, Fabrikas, Kordona, Lešķi, Litene, Silava, Silenieki, Skujenieki, Zāģernieki.

Rivers - Apkārtupe, Dzirla, Gludupīte, Kaugurupīte, Lekšupe, Mugurupe, Pededze, Sita.

Lakes - Kalnis, Kauguru ezers.

References

External links

Parishes of Latvia
Gulbene Municipality